Cariboo North is a provincial electoral district for the Legislative Assembly of British Columbia, Canada.  It was created by 1990 legislation dividing the previous two-member district of Cariboo, which came into effect for the 1991 BC election.

Geography
As of the 2020 provincial election, Cariboo North comprises the northern portion of the Cariboo Regional District. It is located in central British Columbia. Communities in the electoral district consist of Quesnel and Wells.

Demographics

Members of the Legislative Assembly

Electoral history 

|-
 
|NDP
|Bob Simpson
|align="right"|7004
|align="right"|49.51
|align="right"| +2.12
|align="right"|$53,378

|- bgcolor="white"
!align="left" colspan=3|Total
!align="right"|14,148
!align="right"|
!align="right"|
|- bgcolor="white"
!align="right" colspan=3|Total rejected ballots
!align="right"|87
!align="right"|0.61%
!align="right"|
|- bgcolor="white"
!align="right" colspan=3|Turnout
!align="right"|14,235
!align="right"|60.24%
!align="right"|
|}

|-

|NDP
|Bob Simpson
|align="right"|7,353
|align="right"|47.28%
|align="right"|
|align="right"|$45,906

|-

|- bgcolor="white"
!align="right" colspan=3|Total valid votes
!align="right"|15,553
!align="right"|100%
!align="right"|
|- bgcolor="white"
!align="right" colspan=3|Total rejected ballots
!align="right"|126
!align="right"|0.81%
!align="right"|
|- bgcolor="white"
!align="right" colspan=3|Turnout
!align="right"|15,679
!align="right"|64.26%
!align="right"|

|-

|-
 
|NDP
|Frank Garden
|align="right"|2,732
|align="right"|17.67%
|align="right"|
|align="right"|$13,716

|Independent
|Kim McIvor
|align="right"|727
|align="right"|4.70%
|align="right"|
|align="right"|$3,578

|- bgcolor="white"
!align="right" colspan=3|Total valid votes
!align="right"|15,460
!align="right"|100.00%
!align="right"|
|- bgcolor="white"
!align="right" colspan=3|Total rejected ballots
!align="right"|76
!align="right"|0.49%
!align="right"|
|- bgcolor="white"
!align="right" colspan=3|Turnout
!align="right"|15,536
!align="right"|72.46%
!align="right"|

|-

 
|NDP
|Frank Garden
|align="right"|5,180
|align="right"|38.26%
|align="right"|
|align="right"|$36,452
|-

|- bgcolor="white"
!align="right" colspan=3|Total valid votes
!align="right"|13,539
|- bgcolor="white"
!align="right" colspan=3|Total rejected ballots
!align="right"|63
!align="right"|0.46%
|- bgcolor="white"
!align="right" colspan=3|Turnout
!align="right"|13,602
!align="right"|70.05%

|-
 
|NDP
|Frank Garden
|align="right"|4,919
|align="right"|39.10%
|align="right"|
|align="right"|$28,365
|-

|- bgcolor="white"
!align="right" colspan=3|Total valid votes
!align="right"|12,582
!align="right"|100.00%
!align="right"|
|- bgcolor="white"
!align="right" colspan=3|Total rejected ballots
!align="right"|280
!align="right"|2.18%
!align="right"|
|- bgcolor="white"
!align="right" colspan=3|Turnout
!align="right"|12,862
!align="right"|73.15%
!align="right"|

References

External links 
BC Stats - 2001
Results of 2001 election
2001 Expenditures
Results of 1996 election
1996 Expenditures
Results of 1991 election
1991 Expenditures
Website of the Legislative Assembly of British Columbia

British Columbia provincial electoral districts